Kya Love Story Hai is a 2007 Indian romantic comedy film starring Tusshar Kapoor and Ayesha Takia in the lead roles. It is directed by debutant Lovely Singh and produced by Adlabs Films Ltd and V R Entertainers. The film was shot in Cape Town, South Africa. The tagline of the movie is What if... Simplicity is all you need.

Plot 
Story is based in Cape Town, South Africa. Arjun is a wealthy orphan who spends his time in leisure with his friends, Romeo and Chiku. Arjun's path crosses with Kajal and is attracted to her. He befriends Kajal but is unable to confess his feelings for her. One day, Kajal reads a draft of Arjun's love letter. Unaware that she is Arjun's crush, Kajal tells him that she desires a self made, successful man as her life partner. Upset, Arjun travels to Mumbai to establish his career as an architect.

In the months of Arjun's absence, Kajal meets Ranveer Oberoi, a successful business magnate. Ranveer's mother takes a liking to Kajal and encourages her to date her son. Ranveer and Kajal like each other, but Kajal often thinks of Arjun. Although Ranveer is Kajal's ideal man, she is uncertain about him and Ranveer's workaholic tendencies occasionally discomfit her.

Arjun returns as a successful architect, and is upset to learn of Ranveer and Kajal's engagement. He conceals his sorrow and supports the couple. Ranveer is jealous of Kajal's friendship with Arjun but is surprised when Arjun continues to support him. Unknown to Arjun, Kajal learns of his feelings. Ranveer also suspects that Arjun has feelings for Kajal and confronts him about it, telling him to confess to her. Kajal approaches Arjun and admits to being in love with him. Eventually, Kajal and Ranveer amicably cancel their marriage and she marries Arjun instead.

Cast 
 Ayesha Takia as Kajal Mehra
 Tusshar Kapoor as Arjun
 Karan Hukku as Ranveer Oberoi
 Bikramjeet Kanwarpal as Mr. Mehra: Kajal's father
 Sujata Kumar as Ranveer's mother
 Rahul Singh as Chiku: Arjun's friend
 Shyam Mashalkar as Romeo: Arjun's friend
 Poonam Gipson as Suzzane: Kajal's friend
 Liza Ackermann as Vanilla: Chiku's love interest
 Shahid Kapoor in a special appearance
 Kareena Kapoor as special appearance in the song It's Rocking

Music 
The song "It's Rocking" includes sample of very popular 1957 song "Ude Jab Jab Zulfein Teri", which was sung by Asha Bhosle and Mohammed Rafi for the Bollywood film Naya Daur.

Box office

U.K Business
SOURCE : The New York Times

India Business
SOURCE : BoxOfficeIndia

References

External links
 
 

2007 films
2000s Hindi-language films
2000s romantic musical films
Indian romantic musical films
Films featuring songs by Pritam